

Dapr (Distributed Application Runtime) is a free and open source runtime system designed to support cloud native and serverless computing. Its initial release supported SDKs and APIs for Java, .NET, Python, and Go, and targeted the Kubernetes cloud deployment system.   

The source code is written in the Go programming language. It is licensed under MIT License and hosted on GitHub.

See also 
 Microservices
 Service mesh

References

Further reading

External links 

 
 

Serverless computing
Microsoft free software
Software using the Apache license
Software using the MIT license
2019 software